The 1988 Naples bombing was a terrorist attack against a United Service Organizations (USO) military recreational club in downtown Naples, Italy on 14 April 1988. A powerful car bomb exploded in front of the USO club in Calata San Marco which caused the deaths of five people, including an American, and injuries to 15 others. The attack was perpetrated by a Japanese Red Army (JRA) member and came on the second anniversary of the 1986 United States bombing of Libya.

Victims
Four Italian civilians were killed along with a female American assigned to the U.S. Navy center in Naples. She was identified as 21-year-old Angela Simone Santos, a Puerto Rican servicewoman raised in Aguadilla, Puerto Rico and Ocala, Florida. Four American sailors were also among the wounded, and some North Africans were also hurt. Many sailors at the USO probably escaped injury as they were in basement rooms that were shielded from the blast.

Responsibility
Two previously unheard Arab groups claimed responsibility, one of them saying "Imperialist Americans must die two years after their barbarous attack against the Libyan Arab state," referring to the 1986 United States bombing of Libya. Police later identified Junzo Okudaira as the main suspect, a member of the far-left Japanese Red Army (JRA) with links to groups in Lebanon. Okudaira was already wanted in Italy over a rocket and bomb attack against the American and British embassies in Rome in 1987, where nobody was hurt. Okudaira was staying at a hotel under a false Taiwanese identity. The Libyan ambassador said that the Libyan government had nothing to do with the attack.

A few days before the bomb attack, JRA member Yū Kikumura was arrested in the United States. Kikumura was thought to be planning a bomb attack on a U.S. Navy centre in New York City in retaliation to the Libya bombing of 1986, and to be simultaneous to the bombing in Naples.

In 1993, Okudaira was convicted in absentia for murder. He has never been caught.

See also
Rhein-Main Air Base bombing
El Descanso bombing
Bar Iruna attack

References

1988 murders in Italy
20th century in Naples
April 1988 crimes
April 1988 events in Europe
Attacks on military installations in the 1980s
Communist terrorism
Crime in Naples
Improvised explosive device bombings in 1988
Improvised explosive device bombings in Italy
Japanese Red Army
Mass murder in 1988
Terrorist incidents in Italy in 1988
20th-century mass murder in Italy
Building bombings in Europe
Italy–United States military relations
United Service Organizations